The 23rd Iowa Infantry Regiment was an infantry regiment that served in the Union Army during the American Civil War.

Service

Battle of Champion's Hill

On May 16, 1863, attached to General Carr's Fourteenth Division, the regiment was in reserve almost the entire battle. Near the end of the battle, the 23rd was ordered to pursue the retreating Confederate army. The regiment succeeded in capturing multiple prisoners, as well as large quantities of stores from the retreating army. The command to pursue, however, was given too late for General Carr to successfully cut the rebels off from making their escape, which enabled many of the remaining Confederates to mass at the Big Black River despite the assistance of the 23rd and other regiments. These escaped soldiers would bolster some of the Confederate forces during the engagement the following day at the Battle of Big Black River Bridge.

Battle of Big Black River Bridge

During the Vicksburg Campaign, the 23rd Iowa Regiment served under Brigadier General M. K. Lawler's Brigade of Brigadier General Eugene Asa Carr Division. After the Battle of Champion's Hill, Major General John McClernand's corps chased the remaining confederates towards Vicksburg. On May 17, 1863, they arrived at the rebel defenses in front of the Big Black River. This was a strong position in command of the field of battle. Brigadier General Lawler's Second Brigade, containing the 21st, 22nd, 23rd Iowa, and 11th Wisconsin regiments, was first on the scene and positioned at the far right of the line, an excellent position to launch an attack. The distance between their position and the rebel entrenchments was very short. Once it was known that they were to make an assault, the 23rd's own Colonel William Kinsman, volunteered to lead the charge.

The 21st and 23rd Iowa regiments led the charge, while the 22nd Iowa and 11th Wisconsin lined up in support. With a cheer, the attack began. Kinsman went down very early in the charge. "[Kinsman] Struggling to his feet, he staggered a few paces to the front, cheered forward his men, and fell again." Kinsman was fatally wounded by a musket ball that went through his lung. General Grant recalled the moment of victory: "I heard great cheering to the right of our line and, looking in that direction, saw Lawler in his shirt sleeves leading a charge upon the enemy. I immediately mounted my horse and rode in the direction of the charge." The Rebels, already torn and tattered from their loss at Champion Hill, fled their cover and either retreated or surrendered. The 23rd Iowa suffered over half of the Union casualties in the battle, yet their entire charge lasted a mere three minutes. The unit was remarkably weakened after the engagement. When they were put in charge of the prisoners captured in the battle, they sent them up to Memphis. General Lawler said that if the war ended that day, their regiment would surely be one of the most distinguished in the entirety of the war.

Total strength and casualties
A total of 1,070 men served in the 23rd Iowa Volunteer Infantry Regiment during the course of its existence.
It suffered losses of 6 officers and 69 enlisted men who were killed in action or who died of their wounds, and one officer and 208 enlisted men who died of disease, for a total of 284 fatalities.

Commanders
 Colonel William Dewey
 Colonel William H. Kinsman
 Colonel Samuel Lyle Glasgow

See also
List of Iowa Civil War Units
Iowa in the American Civil War

Notes

References

Units and formations of the Union Army from Iowa
Military units and formations established in 1862
1862 establishments in Iowa
Military units and formations disestablished in 1865